Alive Naturalsound Records (also known as Alive Records) is an independent record label formed in 1993 in Los Angeles, California by Patrick Boissel, specializing in garage rock, punk, psychedelic, and blues rock. It grew out of Boissel's association with the U.S. label Bomp! Records.

Artists

Alive bands on tour as of 2022
The Bobby Lees
Beechwood
El Perro (Parker Griggs of Radio Moscow)
Gyasi
Left Lane Cruiser
Paul Collins
Radio Moscow
James Leg
Datura4
Mark "Porkchop" Holder
Handsome Jack
The Black Keys
Two Gallants
Hollis Brown
Buffalo Killers
Lee Bains III & The Glory Fires
GospelbeacH (Beachwood Sparks)
Prima Donna
Lonesome Shack
Artists with releases on Alive Naturalsound

All Tomorrow’s Party
Andre Williams
Andy Gabbard
Beachwood Sparks
Beechwood
Bed of Eyes
Big Midnight
Bloodhounds
Black Angel’s Death Song
Black Diamond Heavies
Bloody Hollies
The Bobby Lees
Boyskout
Brian Olive
Brimstone Howl
Buffalo Killers
Certain General
Charlie Whitehead
Colonel Knowledge & the Lickety Splits
Datura4
Detonations
Deviants IXVI
Dirty Streets
El Perro ((Parker Griggs of Radio Moscow))
DM3
Dodge Main (Deniz Tek , Wayne Kramer, and Scott Morgan - MC5)
Doris Duke
Dripping Lips
G.G. Allin
Gardens
Gyasi
Hacienda
Handsome Jack
Henry’s Funeral Shoe
Hollis Brown
Howlin’ Diablos
Iggy Pop
James Williamson
Irma Thomas
Jack Lee (The Nerves)
James Leg (Black Diamond Heavies)
John Sinclair
John The Conqueror
Kim Fowley
King Mud (Black Diamond Heavies and Left Lane Cruiser)
Lee Bains III & The Glory Fires
Left Lane Cruiser
Libertine
Lightnin' Slim
Lonesome Shack
Mark "Porkchop" Holder (Black Diamond Heavies)
Martin Rev (Suicide)
MC5
Mick Farren
Milky Ways
Mondo Drag
Mount Carmel
Mr. Gloria’s Head
Murder Junkies (G.G. Allin)
Nathaniel Mayer
Neither/Neither World
Nikki Sudden (Swell Maps)
Occult Detective Club
Outrageous Cherry
Painkillers (Left Lane Cruiser and James Leg)
Paul Collins (The Nerves)
PepGirlz
Peter Case (The Nerves)
Prima Donna
Radio Moscow
RF7
Ron Franklin
Rosetta West
Sandra Phillips
Scott Morgan
Soledad Brothers
Sonic’s Rendezvous Band (Scott Morgan, MC5)
SSM
Stoneage Hearts
Streetwalkin’ Cheetahs
Sulfur City
Swamp Dogg
Swell Maps (Nikki Sudden)
T-Model Ford
The Black Keys
The Bloodhounds
The Bonnevilles
The Breakaways (Peter Case, Paul Collins)
The Deviants (Mick Farren)
Germs
The Love Drunks
The Nerves
The Plimsouls
The Powder Monkeys
The Red Tyger Church
The Sights
The Streetwalkin’ Cheetahs
Thee Michelle Gun Elephant
Thomas Function
Trainwreck Riders
Turpentine Brothers
Two Gallants
Tyson Vogel (Two Gallants)
U.S. Bombs
Very Ape
Waves of Fury
Wayne Kramer
White Noise Sound
Witches
Wolfmoon
Z.Z. Hill

Discography

References

External links
 Alive Naturalsound Records official site
 Alive Naturalsound Records current artists
 Alive Naturalsound Records 20th Anniversary
 Patrick Boissel of Alive Naturalsound interview for The Black Keys Fan Lounge

 
American record labels